Borkan (also Romanized as Borkān and Borakān; also known as Būrkūr) is a village in Baraan-e Jonubi Rural District, in the Central District of Isfahan County, Isfahan Province, Iran. At the 2006 census, its population was 1,477, in 446 families.

References 

Populated places in Isfahan County